The Rulo Bridge is the name for whatever bridge crosses Missouri River on U.S. Route 159 (US 159) from the village of Rulo in Richardson County, Nebraska, to Holt County, Missouri, west of Big Lake.

1939 Bridge 
The old Rulo bridge was a truss bridge built in 1939 by the Works Progress Administration and Kansas City Bridge Company and was added to the National Register of Historic Places in 1993. It was featured in the movie Paper Moon. The current Rulo Bridge would then be dismantled.

2013 Bridge 
The new Rulo bridge opened in 2013, and the historic bridge was imploded on January 19, 2014. It was removed from the National Register the next year.  The replacement bridge was indefinitely closed to all traffic in April 2019 as a result of the 2019 Midwestern U.S. floods. It reopened in September 2019 for access to Missouri Route 111, and the remainder of U.S. Route 159 was reopened in late October for access to Interstate 29.

See also

List of crossings of the Missouri River
List of bridges on the National Register of Historic Places in Nebraska
List of bridges on the National Register of Historic Places in Missouri
National Register of Historic Places listings in Richardson County, Nebraska
National Register of Historic Places listings in Holt County, Missouri
List of historic bridges in Nebraska

References

External links

Nebraska Department of Roads Rulo Bridge Construction website
Bridgehunter

Buildings and structures in Holt County, Missouri
Buildings and structures in Richardson County, Nebraska
Road bridges on the National Register of Historic Places in Missouri
Road bridges on the National Register of Historic Places in Nebraska
Bridges completed in 1939
Bridges of the United States Numbered Highway System
Bridges over the Missouri River
Works Progress Administration in Missouri
Works Progress Administration in Nebraska
U.S. Route 159
Interstate vehicle bridges in the United States
National Register of Historic Places in Richardson County, Nebraska
Truss bridges in the United States
Metal bridges in the United States
Former National Register of Historic Places in Nebraska